The Hoosier-Buckeye Conference, also known as the Hoosier-Buckeye Collegiate Conference and prior to 1971 as the Hoosier Conference or Hoosier College Conference, was an intercollegiate athletics conference that existed from 1947 to 1985. As the name suggests, its member schools were located in the states of Indiana and Ohio. Many of its members are now in the Heartland Collegiate Athletic Conference.

Member schools

Final members
The HBCC had seven final full members, all were private schools:

Former members
The HBCC had six former full members, all were private schools:

Membership timeline

Football champions

Hoosier Conference

 1947 – 
 1948 – Anderson (IN) and Hanover
 1949 – Hanover
 1950 – Canterbury
 1951 – Hanover
 1952 – Hanover
 1953 – Indiana Central
 1954 – Indiana Central
 1955 – Indiana Central

 1956 – Hanover
 1957 – Anderson (IN) and Hanover
 1958 – Hanover
 1959 – Anderson (IN)
 1960 – Indiana Central
 1961 – Anderson (IN)
 1962 – Taylor
 1963 – Taylor

 1964 – Taylor
 1965 – Anderson (IN)
 1966 – Franklin (IN) and Manchester (IN)
 1967 – Taylor
 1968 – Anderson (IN) and Manchester (IN)
 1969 – Anderson (IN)
 1970 – Anderson (IN) and Earlham

Hoosier-Buckeye Conference

 1971 – Anderson (IN) and Findlay
 1972 – Bluffton
 1973 – Hanover
 1974 – Hanover
 1975 – Hanover

 1976 – Defiance, Findlay, and Hanover
 1977 – Defiance and Findlay
 1978 – Findlay
 1979 – Findlay and Hanover
 1980 – Anderson (IN), Hanover, and Wilmington (OH)

 1981 – Anderson (IN)
 1982 – Findlay and Wilmington (OH)
 1983 – Findlay and Wilmington (OH)
 1984 – Findlay 
 1985 – Findlay

See also
 List of defunct college football conferences

References